Boettger Competições is a Brazilian motorsport team owned Ereneu Boettger. in 2003 the team won the Stock Car Brasil Championship with David Muffato, driving a Chevrolet Vectra.

References

Stock Car Brasil teams